Limor Shreibman-Sharir (born 1954) (Hebrew: לימור שרייבמן-שריר) is an Israeli writer and physician. She was Miss Israel in 1973 and placed fifth in the Miss Universe pageant.

Biography
Limor Schreibman (later Sharir) was born and grew up in Tel Aviv, the daughter of Eliezer Schreibman, a school principal.

In 1972, after graduating from Tichon Ironi Alef high school, Schreibman was drafted into the Israeli army. In 1973, she won Israel's beauty queen contest. She was sent as a contestant to the Miss Universe contest held in Greece in 1973, where she placed fifth. When the competition was over, she returned to the IDF as a clerk for General Shmuel Gonen who had been promoted to Southern Command of the Israel Defense Forces.

Medical career
After completion of her military service, she began to study medicine at Sapienza University of Rome in Italy. Later, she transferred to the Sackler Faculty of Medicine of Tel Aviv University and graduated with a medical degree. Her dissertation was presented to an international conference in New York and subsequently published in The Journal of Thoracic Cardiovascular Surgery.

Schreibman did her internship at Sheba Medical Center, where she worked for several years. Today she is a member of Physicians for Human Rights-Israel.

Since 2010–2011, she has been the coordinator of a special course at Tel Aviv University's School of Medicine on "literature and medicine." Schreibman is a member in the Israeli Organization for Medical Education.

Literary career

Sharir was a prose advisor for Carmel publishing house. She also sits on the Israeli Council for Culture and Arts in Ministry of Culture and Sport. She is a member of the editing board of  "Moznayim" – the monthly Magazine of Hebrew Writers Association in Israel and the editor of culture and medicine section of the "Reshet Refua" website.

Schreibman-Sharir's book "God and Elvira" published in 2005 in Hebrew, was translated into Italian and published in Italy in 2012.

Published works
The House on the Lake, Yedioth Books. 2004. 
Four childhood friends growing up in the villages at the foot of Wolfgang Lake. Salzkammergut area, Austria  before World War II. In 1938, the world they knew changed when Germany occupied Austria, and they became citizens of Nazi Germany. Reading their thoughts and deeds we learn about the attitude of the Austrians toward Jews and various ethical and political issues through the eyes of the protagonists, non-Jewish Austrians.
God and Elvira, Carmel Publishing House, 2005.
Red Wildberries, Carmel Publishing House, 2007.
The story takes place in the State of Israel in the 1990s, before the 1982 Lebanon War. Darya, an educated and assertive woman, a lecturer of Greek mythology at Tel Aviv University is single, without children and full of contradictions. 
The Gold and Silver Dunes, Carmel Publishing House, 2008.
A collection of twenty two stories occurring in different places in Israel (Binyamina, Jewish Quarter, south Tel Aviv, Hadera) and the world (Paris, Munich, Salzburg, Palermo and Marrakesh). 
Menagerie of Fantasies, Carmel Publishing House, 2009.
The human life cycle described by animals with anthropomorphic illustrations by the author. 
Marrakesh Secrets, Carmel Publishing House, 2010. 
The plot takes place in the days of king Hassan II of Morocco. Naim is a twelve-year-old boy living with his parents in Marrakesh. His father, Mahmud Laishi, a journalist and editor of "Morocco News" was murdered due to his political views. Morocco is depicted as a wild country, full of magic and decadence, sex and submission to the monarchic dictatorship. 
Martin Buber: Close look – A conversation with Prof. Judith Buber-Agassi"', Carmel Publishing House, 2011.
A biographical-philosophical book based on Limor Sharir's conversations with Prof. Judith Buber-Agassi, Martin Buber's granddaughter. This is a personal story about an eminent Jewish family in the German world of the late 19th century and first half of the 20th century.Reflections – Letters to imaginary heroes in my books and life ''', Carmel Publishing House, 2013.

See also
Literature of Israel
Health care in Israel

References

External links
 Elkayam, Liat (7 September 2013).  "Miss Israel's journey of fame and terror", Haaretz
 Limor Schreibman-Sharir books in 'Simania' site
 Limor Schreibman-Sharir in Carmel publishing house
 Rubin, Noga (June 2013). An interview with Schreibman-Sharir, Kolot, issue no. 6, pp. 8–10.
 Her articles in "Reshet Refua"

Israeli Jews
Israeli novelists
Israeli cardiologists
Israeli women novelists
Israeli women physicians
Jewish novelists
Miss Israel winners
Miss Universe 1973 contestants
People from Tel Aviv
Tel Aviv University alumni
1954 births
Living people